The Carlton Barber's Shop fire was an act of mass murder that killed twenty people and injured seven others in the Carlton Barber's Shop, a massage parlor in Taipei, Taiwan on May 12, 1993. The perpetrator, 52-year-old Liang Hsin-teng, had an argument with the shop's owner. He set himself on fire and the blaze spread to the other levels of the shop and killed most of the victims by asphyxiation.

Arson
On May 12, 1993 Liang, who operated an illegal lottery, had an argument with the shop's owner about the payment of NT$700,000 in gambling debt. When the shop's owner refused to pay Liang doused himself with gasoline and, shouting curses, set himself on fire in the basement of the establishment, which occupied three levels of a 12-storey building on Songjiang Road (松江路). The blaze quickly spread to the two other levels of the shop, asphyxiating most of the victims. The parlor had been repeatedly warned by police in the preceding months that it was violating safety regulations.

References

Further reading
民國82年男子自焚討債 21人命喪卡爾登, cts.com.tw (March 7, 2011)

1993 in Taiwan 
Man-made disasters in Taiwan
Mass murder in 1993
Massacres in Taiwan
May 1993 events in Asia
1993 fires in Asia
Murder–suicides in Asia
Mass murder in Taiwan
1993 crimes in Taiwan 
1990s murders in Taiwan
1993 disasters in Taiwan